This is a list of football clubs in Indonesia. Currently the governing body of football in Indonesia is the Football Association of Indonesia (PSSI), which is in charge of its national teams and its leagues, with the highest one being Liga 1.

By Province

League or status at 2022:

Aceh

Bali

Bangka Belitung Islands

Banten

Bengkulu

Central Java

Central Kalimantan

Central Papua

Central Sulawesi

East Java

East Kalimantan

East Nusa Tenggara

Gorontalo

Highland Papua

Jakarta

Jambi

Lampung

Maluku

North Kalimantan

North Maluku

North Sulawesi

North Sumatra

Papua

Riau

Riau Islands

Southeast Sulawesi

Southwest Papua

South Kalimantan

South Papua

South Sulawesi

South Sumatra

Special Region of Yogyakarta

West Java

West Kalimantan

West Nusa Tenggara

West Papua

West Sulawesi

West Sumatra

Defunct clubs

 Aceh United (2019)
 Arseto (1978–1988)
 Assyabaab Surabaya (1948–1997)
 Banten Jaya (2019)
 Bali Devata (2010–2011)
 Bareti 1698 (1998–2021)
 Bintang Medan (2011)
 Blitar United (2019)
 Bogor (2019)
 Bonek (2015)
 BPD Jateng
 Cilegon United (2012–2021)
 Krama Yudha Tiga Berlian
 Makassar Utama
 Martapura (2009–2021)
 Mataram Utama (2021–2022)
 Muba Babel United (2022)
 Perkesa Mataram
 Pelalawan United (2019)
 Persebo Bondowoso (2016)
 Persebo Musi Raya (2017)
 Persebam Babakan Madang (2020)
 Persegi Gianyar
 Persekabtas Tasikmalaya (2018–2022)
 Perseru Serui (1970–2019)
 Persikabo Bogor (1973–2019)
 Persikubar West Kutai (2010)
 Persimuba Musi Banyuasin (2019)
 Persiram Raja Ampat (2004–2015)
 Persires Rengat
 Persisam Putra Samarinda (2015)
 Pro Duta FC (2017)
 PS Pusri Palembang
 PS TIRA (2018)
 PS TNI (2015–2017)
 PSAD Surabaya (2019)
 PSG Gresik (2020)
 PSG Pati (2021)
 Semeru (2017–2020)
 Solok (2019)
 Sukabumi (2022)
 Surabaya United (2015)
 Sragen United (2018)
 TIRA-Persikabo (2020–2021)

See also 
 List of women's football clubs in Indonesia
 Indonesia national football team
 Indonesian football league system

 
Indonesia
Football clubs
clubs